The runabout 1100 stock event at the 2018 Asian Games took place on 23–25 August 2018 at Ancol Beach, Jakarta, Indonesia.

Schedule
All times are Western Indonesia Time (UTC+07:00)

Results
Legend
DNR — Did not race

References

External links 
 Jet ski at the 2018 Asian Games – Runabout 1100 stock

Runabout 1100 stock